Build–operate–transfer (BOT) or build–own–operate–transfer (BOOT) is a form of project delivery method, usually for large-scale infrastructure projects, wherein a private entity receives a concession from the public sector (or the private sector on rare occasions) to finance, design, construct, own, and operate a facility stated in the concession contract. The private entity will have the right to operate it for a set period of time. This enables the project proponent to recover its investment and operating and maintenance expenses in the project.

BOT is usually a model used in public–private partnerships. Due to the long-term nature of the arrangement, the fees are usually raised during the concession period. The rate of increase is often tied to a combination of internal and external variables, allowing the proponent to reach a satisfactory internal rate of return for its investment.

Countries where BOT is prevalent are Thailand, Turkey, Taiwan, Bahrain, Pakistan, Saudi Arabia, Israel, India, Iran, Croatia, Japan, China, Vietnam, Malaysia,  Philippines, Egypt, Myanmar and a few US states (California, Florida, Indiana, Texas, and Virginia). However, in some countries, such as Canada, Australia, New Zealand and Nepal, the term used is build–own–operate–transfer (BOOT).
The first BOT was for the China Hotel, built in 1979 by the Hong Kong listed conglomerate Hopewell Holdings Ltd (controlled by Sir Gordon Wu).

BOT framework

BOT finds extensive application in infrastructure projects and public–private partnership. In the BOT framework a third party, for example the public administration, delegates to a private sector entity to design and build infrastructure and to operate and maintain these facilities for a certain period. During this period, the private party has the responsibility to raise the finance for the project and is entitled to retain all revenues generated by the project and is the owner of the regarded facilities. The facility will be then transferred to the public administration at the end of the concession agreement, without any remuneration of the private entity involved. 
Some or even all of the following different parties could be involved in any BOT project:
The host government: Normally, the government is the initiator of the infrastructure project and decides if the BOT model is appropriate to meet its needs. In addition, the political and economic circumstances are main factors for this decision. The government provides normally support for the project in some form (provision of the land/ changed laws).
The concessionaire: The project sponsors who act as concessionaire create a special purpose entity which is capitalised through their financial contributions.
Lending banks: Most BOT projects are funded to a big extent by commercial debt. The bank will be expected to finance the project on "non-recourse" basis meaning that it has recourse to only the special purpose entity and all its assets for the repayment of the debt.
Other lenders: The special purpose entity might have other lenders such as national or regional development banks.
Parties to the project contracts: Because the special purpose entity has only limited workforce, it will subcontract a third party to perform its obligations under the concession agreement. Additionally, it has to assure that it has adequate supply contracts in place for the supply of raw materials and other resources necessary for the project.

A BOT project is typically used to develop a discrete asset rather than a whole network and is generally entirely new or greenfield in nature (although refurbishment may be involved). In a BOT project the project company or operator generally obtains its revenues through a fee charged to the utility/ government rather than tariffs charged to consumers. A number of projects are called concessions, such as toll road projects, which are new build and have a number of similarities to BOTs.

In general, a project is financially viable for the private entity if the revenues generated by the project cover its cost and provide sufficient return on investment. On the other hand, the viability of the project for the host government depends on its efficiency in comparison with the economics of financing the project with public funds. Even if the host government could borrow money on better conditions than a private company could, other factors could offset this particular advantage. For example, the expertise and efficiency that the private entity is expected to bring as well as the risk transfer. Therefore, the private entity bears a substantial part of the risk. These are some types of the most common risks involved: 
Political risk: especially in the developing countries because of the possibility of dramatic overnight political change.
Technical risk: construction difficulties, for example unforeseen soil conditions, breakdown of equipment
Financing risk: foreign exchange rate risk and interest rate fluctuation, market risk (change in the price of raw materials), income risk (over-optimistic cash-flow forecasts), cost overrun risk

BOOT Framework 

The BOOT procurement strategy utilizes project finance to fund large-scale greenfield infrastructure projects such as local power stations, water treatment facilities and sewage facilities, or transit infrastructure, etc.

BOOT delivery model is different to the BOT (build-operate-transfer) delivery model, in which the private party does not own the project as an asset, they only receive a concession to operate it for a period of time.

The BOOT delivery model is different to the PPP (public-private partnerships), which refer to project agreements where a private entity takes over the building and operation part of a government-owned infrastructure.

Build-own-operate-transfer is often the best kind of delivery model, in which a private sector party, or consortium, receives a mandate from a private or public sector client to finance, design, construct, own, and operate a long-term project.

If you have been awarded a BOOT contract this means that during that time period, you the private party or your consortium owns and operates the facility; your goal is to recover the costs of your investment and operations and maintenance, and also make a profit from your project.

While you manage your contract you generate profit by charging fees from the users of your project, and have the project as an asset.

While the risk is yours, this risk is offset by various government incentives, funding, tax breaks, money to hire select people (such as unemployment job initiatives), and any other benefits that the regulatory body sees fit to grant you.

At the end of the contractual period (typically in the order of decades), ownership of the construction is given back to the state (or federal actor). You may receive a fee for this transfer.

Alternatives to BOT

The scale of investment by the private sector and type of arrangement means there is typically no strong incentive for early completion of a project or to deliver a product at a reasonable price. This type of private sector participation is also known as design-build. Contrasted below, are reasons why the BOT model and it’s variants may work for you the end user, or government body.

Modified versions of the ‘turnkey’ procurement and BOT ‘build-operate-transfer’ model exist for different types of public-private partnership (PPP) projects, in which the main contractor is appointed to design and construct the works. This contrasts with the traditional procurement route (the build-design model) where the client first appoints consultants to design the development and then appoints a contractor to construct the works.

The private contractor designs and builds a facility for a fixed fee, rate or total cost, which is one of the key criteria in selecting the winning bid. The contractor assumes risks involved in the design and construction phases.

Turnkey procurement under a design-build contract means that the design-build team would serve as the owner’s representative to determine the specific needs of the user groups; meet with the vendors to select the best options and pricing; advise the owner on the most logical options; plan and build the spaces to accommodate the function of the project; coordinate purchases and timelines; install the infrastructure; facilitate training of staff to use the equipment; and outline care and maintenance in addition to being responsible for the design and construction of the works to the employer’s requirements, the contractor is also responsible for operating and maintaining the completed facility. The operation and maintenance period will span decades during which time the contractor is said to have the ‘concession’ and is responsible for the operation of the facility, and benefits from operational income. The facility itself however remains the property of the employer.

DBO design-build-operate contract is a project delivery model in which a single contractor is appointed to design and build a project and then to operate it for a period of time.

The common form of such a contract is a PPP public-private partnership, in which a public client (e.g. government or public agency) enters into a contract with a private contractor to design, build and then operate the project, while the client finances the project and retains ownership.

DBFO design-build-finance-operate which also assigns the responsibility to the private organisation to design, build, finance and operate. Financing your competitive project may be easy when there is a high demand for a service right now, and investors will throw money at any project that claims the spoils, such as opening a new airport in a busy metropolis.

BLT build-lease-transfer, in which the public sector partner leases the project from the contractor and also takes responsibility for its operation.

ROT renovate-operate-transfer is a procurement method for infrastructure that already exists but is performing substandard.

As you know, when essential services are no longer operating efficiently or effectively, repairs can be costly. When an obsolete facility or amenity (any public service such as telephone lines etc.) becomes outdated and requires expensive repairs, it can be financed through public-private partnerships; between public entities and private contractors that are able to provide renovation services and operate the project management after the repairs have been completed.

Economic theory 
In contract theory, several authors have studied the pros and cons of bundling the building and operating stages of infrastructure projects. In particular, Oliver Hart (2003) has used the incomplete contracting approach in order to investigate whether incentives to make non-contractible investments are smaller or larger when the different stages of the project are combined under one private contractor. Hart (2003) argues that under bundling incentives to make cost-reducing investments are larger than under unbundling. However, sometimes the incentives to make cost-reducing investments may be excessive because they lead to overly large reductions of quality, so it depends on the details of the project whether bundling or unbundling is optimal. Hart's (2003) work has been extended in many directions. For example, Bennett and Iossa (2006) and Martimort and Pouyet (2008) investigate the interaction of bundling and ownership rights, while Hoppe and Schmitz (2013, 2021) explore the implications of bundling for making innovations.

See also 

 Adelaide–Darwin railway
 Central Texas Turnpike System
 Confederation Bridge
 Pay on production
 Private finance initiative
 Privatization
 Project finance
 Shadow toll

References

 
Infrastructure investment
Public administration
Public finance
Public–private partnership